This is a list of commercial banks in Algeria

 Banque extérieure  d’Algérie  (BEA) 
 Banque nationale d’Algérie (BNA) 
 Banque de l'agriculture et du développement rural (BADR) 
 Banque de développement local (BDL)
 Crédit populaire d'Algérie (CPA) 
 Caisse nationale d'épargne et de prévoyance (CNEP Banque) 
 Caisse nationale de mutualité agricole (CNMA) 
 Banque Al Baraka Algerie 
 Arab Banking Corporation (ABC) 
 Natixis Banque  
 Societe Generale Algerie
 Citibank
 Arab Bank Plc
 BNP Paribas el Djazair
 Trust Bank Algeria
 Gulf Bank Algeria
 Housing Bank for Trade and Finance
 Fransabank el Djazair
 Calyon Algerie SPA
 Al Salam Bank Algeria SPA
 HSBC Algeria SPA
 Bank of Algeria

See also
 List of banks in Africa

References

External links
 Website of the Bank of Algeria (French)

 
Algeria
Banks
Africa